Qabr-e Musa (also Romanized as Qabr-e Mūsá) is a village in Kuhdasht-e Jonubi Rural District, in the Central District of Kuhdasht County, Lorestan Province, Iran. At the 2006 census, its population was 698, in 150 families.

References 

Towns and villages in Kuhdasht County